A peninsula is a piece of land bordered by water on three sides.

Peninsula may also refer to:
Peninsula Campaign of the American Civil War
Peninsular War of 1808
Peninsula Shield Force, a military alliance of the Middle East
Peninsula, Ohio, a village in Summit County, Ohio
The Peninsula Hotels, a chain of luxury hotels founded in 1928
Peninsula (film), a 2020 South Korean zombie film by Yeon Sang-ho

See also
List of peninsulas
The Peninsula (disambiguation)